Alfred Basel (23 March 1876 – 24 January 1920) was an Austrian painter and etcher.

Born in Vienna to a factory owner, Basel studied at the Wiener Kunstgewerbeschule under Felician von Myrbach between 1892 and 1898. He was a reserve officer during the First World War, serving with the rank of Oberleutnant in the Fourth Army on the Galician front from March 1915. In the fall he fell ill and was declared unfit for military service. By November he was a war artist serving the Kriegspressequartier. In 1916 he was on the Vistula, in the Carpathians, in Albania, on the Isonzo, and in the Ukraine. It was his artistic breakthrough.

In 1919, at the winter exhibition of the Wiener Künstlerhaus, Basel exhibited his work outside of the Kriegspressequartier for the first time. His treatment of military events was careful and accurate, and both stylistically and biographically he has many similarities to Oskar Laske. Like him, Basel avoids sensationalising or exaggerating, and favours crowds of small figures and a simplicity approaching photographic accuracy.

Alfred died from the effects of a hunting accident in Dickenau, Türnitz, Lower Austria.

References
This article is translated from the corresponding article at the German Wikipedia.

Further reading
Popelka, Liselotte. Vom Hurra zum Leichenfeld: Gemälde aus der Kriegsbildersammlung, 1914–1918. Vienna: 1981.

External links
Alfred Basel at Art of the First World War.

1876 births
1920 deaths
Artists from Vienna
19th-century Austrian painters
Austrian male painters
20th-century Austrian painters
20th-century Austrian male artists
Austrian war artists
19th-century Austrian male artists